Audrey Fowler was a female English international table tennis player.

She won a bronze medal at the 1948 World Table Tennis Championships in the women's doubles with Irene Lentle.

See also
 List of table tennis players
 List of World Table Tennis Championships medalists

References

English female table tennis players
World Table Tennis Championships medalists